The Diocese of Duluth may refer to

Episcopal Diocese of Duluth, a defunct diocese of the Episcopal Church (United States)
Roman Catholic Diocese of Duluth